Women's 100m races for athletes with cerebral palsy at the 2004 Summer Paralympics were held in the Athens Olympic Stadium. Events were held in three disability classes, each completed in a single race.

T34

The T34 event was won by Chelsea Clark, representing .

Final Round
22 Sept. 2004, 20:20

T36

The T36 event was won by Wang Fang, representing .

Final Round
22 Sept. 2004, 20:35

T37

The T37 event was won by Oksana Krechunyak, representing .

Final Round
26 Sept. 2004, 20:20

References

W
2004 in women's athletics